Matthew Asen Kantakouzenos or Cantacuzenus (Greek: Ματθαῖος Ἀσάνης Καντακουζηνός, Matthaios Asanēs Kantakouzēnos, c. 1325 – 1383 or 1391) was Byzantine Emperor from 1353 to 1357 and later Despot of the Morea from 1380 to 1383.

Life
Matthew Asanes Kantakouzenos was the son of Emperor John VI Kantakouzenos and Irene Asanina. In return for the support he gave to his father during his struggle with John V Palaiologos, he was given part of Thrace as an appanage in 1347, and was proclaimed joint emperor in 1353, when open civil war broke out again with John V.

From his Thracian domain, centred on Gratzianous, he led several wars against the Serbs. An attack, which he prepared in 1350, was frustrated by the defection of his Turkish auxiliaries. However, with five thousand Turks he tried to re-establish his former appanage along the Serbian-Byzantine border by attacking this region but failed to take Serres and soon was defeated in battle in late 1356 or early 1357 by a Serb army under Vojvoda Vojihna, the holder of Drama,o a major fortress in the vicinity. The Serbs captured Matthew with the intention of releasing him when he had raised the large ransom they demanded. However John V, who had rapidly moved in to occupy Matthew's lands, offered Vojihna an even larger sum to turn Matthew over to him.

After imprisoning Matthew first on Tenedos, then on Lesbos under the watchful eye of Francesco I Gattilusio, John forced him to renounce the imperial title. John then released him to go to the Morea, where he joined his brother Manuel, who was ruling there (1361). After his brother's death in 1380, Matthew Asanes Kantakouzenos governed the Morea until the appointment of the new governor Theodore I Palaiologos, in 1381, and his arrival in 1382.  Before full transition of power in the Morea, from the Kantakouzenos family to that of Palaiologos, Matthew resigned his power in the Morea to his son Demetrios I Kantakouzenos.

Family
By his wife Irene Palaiologina, whom he married in Thessalonika early in 1341, Matthew Asanes Kantakouzenos had five known children:
 John Kantakouzenos, despotēs
 Demetrios Kantakouzenos, sebastokratōr
 Theodora Kantakouzene
 Helena Kantakouzene, who married Louis Fadrique, Count of Salona
 Maria Kantakouzene, who married John Laskaris Kalopheros
 (possibly) Theodore Kantakouzenos, ambassador to France and Venice

References

Sources
 
 
 
 

1320s births
14th-century deaths
Matthew
Palaiologos dynasty
Eastern Orthodox monarchs
14th-century Byzantine emperors
14th-century Despots of the Morea
Byzantine junior emperors
Asen dynasty
Sons of Byzantine emperors